Radcliffe is a settlement in the county of Northumberland, England. It is located 1 km south of the town of Amble.

Radcliffe was a mining community, once home to over 700 people. A colliery was worked here until 1892, when a fault in the seam, then fire and flooding, made coal extraction uneconomical. New pit shafts were sunk nearby at Newburgh and later at Hauxley, but flooding remained a problem with the pits in this area.

Through much of the 19th and early to mid-20th century, the name of the settlement included the word Terrace - "Radcliffe Terrace, Hauxley" giving the erroneous impression that it was part of Hauxley (or another local town); despite this, it was an independent (and somewhat isolated) settlement. The first word can be found spelled with many variations, even relatively recently: Ratliff, Radcliffe, Ratcliffe, Ratcliff, and Radcliff (and possibly others).

By the mid-twentieth century, the surviving pits in this area of Northumberland were also becoming uneconomical to run, especially when compared to extraction using opencast mining techniques. The last shift worked underground at Radcliffe  was on 2 February 1962. In 1965 plans were drawn up to opencast mine the coal seam beneath Radcliffe and Newbrough.

The aging, and somewhat run-down, colliery-owned housing stock of the village was demolished in 1971 to allow for opencast operations. The inhabitants that had not already moved voluntarily to take advantage of better housing, were relocated to Amble, onto an estate named the Radcliffe estate. Various streets in this town, such as Dandsfield Square, an award-winning project when first built , are named after the demolished streets of Radcliffe.

As of 2009, opencast mining continues in the area, but the mining operations at Radcliffe have ceased, and the land returned to agriculture, and turned over to a nature reserve at Hauxley. Little is now visible at the site of the village - a farm, a few private houses, a mechanic's workshop, and the old sports pavilion survived the demolition. The workshop was the site of Craiggs' Bus Garage, and has re-opened as a repair workshop specialising in agricultural machinery. The house opposite was the home of Charlie Nyberg, who ran a newsagency and barbershop from there. This house, built circa 1960, replaced the previous house and Post Office, demolished for road widening. At the nature reserve, the footings of some features (paths, picnic area, etc.) are partially made with bricks, some of which show the imprint of Radcliff (many collieries included a brickworks). Some newer homes have also been built along the A1068 Amble to Ashington road.

On Sunday, 15 February 1942, at 8:22 pm, a landmine was dropped on Radcliffe by a German aeroplane being chased by an RAF fighter plane. Three houses, a school, and a church were demolished. Three members of the Craiggs' extended family were killed, and several others injured. Casualties would have been much higher if the service in the church had not finished shortly before, and the congregation dispersed.

The Radcliffe War Memorial, erected in 1928 for the First World War, and with an additional roll of honour added for the fallen of the Second World War, was removed from Radcliffe and relocated to Amble, opposite the Amble Clock Tower Memorial in the Town Square.  The original location can still be seen at the west side of the A1068 to the south of the village, where the surrounding wrought iron railings remain.

Governance 
Radcliffe  is in the parliamentary constituency of Berwick-upon-Tweed.

References

External links
 The History of Hauxley Township
 Radcliffe War Memorial

Villages in Northumberland